Helene Hale (March 23, 1918 – February 1, 2013) was an American politician from the state of Hawaii.

Hale was born Helene Eleanor Hilyer in Minneapolis, Minnesota on March 23, 1918. From 1955 until 1963 she served on the County of Hawaii Board of Supervisors. From 1963 until 1965 she was the County's Chairman and Executive Officer (a forerunner of the mayoral position). In that position, she was the first woman to serve as a mayor in Hawaii.

The Merrie Monarch Festival began in 1963 when Helene Hale, then Executive Officer of Hawaii, decided to create an event to increase tourism to the Island of Hawaii.

In 2000, at the age of 82, Hale won a seat in the Hawaii House of Representatives as a Democrat. She served six years representing the 4th district in the legislature before retiring in 2006 following a stroke.

Hale was multiracial, her grandfather was the first African-American to graduate from the University of Minnesota and her uncle Ralph Bunche was the first African American to win the Nobel Peace Prize. She was pictured on the cover of Ebony in 1963.

References

External links
 "Legislature 2006: The House" January 15, 2006 Honolulu Advertiser

1918 births
2013 deaths
Democratic Party members of the Hawaii House of Representatives
Hawaii County Council members
Women state legislators in Hawaii
Mayors of Hawaii County
African-American state legislators in Hawaii
African-American women in politics
Politicians from Minneapolis
20th-century African-American people
21st-century African-American people
20th-century African-American women
21st-century African-American women
Women mayors of places in Hawaii